Randall Mark Schmidt was a lieutenant general in the United States Air Force.

Schmidt was appointed to conduct an inquiry into FBI reports that detainees at Guantanamo Bay were being subjected to inhumane interrogation.
The unclassified summary of Schmidt's report acknowledges that one high-value detainee was subjected to almost continuous interrogation, for 18 to 20 hours per day, for almost two months.  It describes the long-term effect of this interrogation as "degrading and abusive", but that it did not rise to the level of "inhumane".

Featured in the 2008 Academy award-winning documentary Taxi to the Dark Side 

He was formerly the Commander, 12th Air Force and Air Forces Southern, Davis-Monthan Air Force Base, Arizona. Twelfth Air Force comprises seven active-duty wings and three direct reporting units in the western and midwestern United States. The fighter and bomber wings possess 400 aircraft and more than 33,000 active-duty military and civilian personnel. The three direct reporting units, the 3rd Combat Communications Group, 820th Red Horse Squadron and 1st Air Support Operations Group, comprise more than 1,200 personnel. He is also responsible for the operational readiness of 12th Air Force-gained wings of the Air Force Reserve and Air National Guard, featuring an additional 18,800 personnel and more than 200 aircraft. As the Commander, Air Forces Southern, a component to the Combatant Commander, U.S. Southern Command, he oversees Air Force assets, five forward operating locations, and civil and military engagements in Central and South America as well as the Caribbean.

General Schmidt entered the Air Force through the United States Air Force Academy in 1972. He has commanded a fighter squadron, operations group, three wings and a combatant Joint Task Force. He also served in key positions during tours with the Air Staff, major commands and the Joint Staff.

General Schmidt is a command pilot with more than 4,600 hours, primarily in fighter aircraft. He flew the F-15C in combat operations during operations Provide Comfort and Southern Watch. He served as a mission commander against the hostile resurgent force of Iraqi Integrated Air Defense Systems while serving as the operations group commander at Incirlik Air Base, Turkey, for the multi-national air component. General Schmidt also commanded the 5th and 7th Air Expeditionary Wings in Southwest Asia in response to hostile Iraqi maneuvers in the southern no-fly zone. As Commander, Joint Task Force – Southwest Asia, he led the effort to destroy more than 380 enemy targets. The general had a direct impact in supporting combat operations when he served as the Headquarters U.S. Air Force Assistant Deputy Chief of Staff for Air and Space Operations during Operation Iraqi Freedom.

Schmidt retired September 1, 2006.

On June 8, 2008, the Washington Post reported that Schmidt was expected to testify at the military commission of Mohammed Jawad, about the use of the "frequent flyer"  program.
The frequent flier program was the technique of repeatedly moving a captive from one cell to another, to keep them sleep deprived.
During one fourteen-day period Jawad was reported to have been moved 112 times.
Schmidt wrote:

Education
1972 Bachelor of Science degree in engineering management, United States Air Force Academy, Colorado Springs, Colorado
1976 Master of Arts degree in psychology, University of Northern Colorado
1977 Distinguished graduate, Squadron Officer School, Maxwell AFB, Alabama
1983 Distinguished graduate, Air Command and Staff College, Maxwell AFB, Alabama
1991 Air War College, Maxwell AFB, Alabama
1998 Program for Senior Executives in National and International Security Affairs, John F. Kennedy School of Government, Harvard University

Assignments
June 1972 – June 1973, student, undergraduate pilot training, Williams AFB, Arizona
June 1973 – December 1973, student, Replacement Training Unit, 474th Tactical Fighter Wing, Nellis AFB, Nevada
January 1974 – June 1977, F-111 fighter pilot, 366th Tactical Fighter Wing, Mountain Home AFB, Idaho
June 1977 – July 1979, F-111 instructor pilot, and standardization and evaluation officer, 48th Tactical Fighter Wing, Royal Air Force Lakenheath, England
July 1979 – May 1980, action officer, Air Staff Training Program, Directorate of Personnel, Headquarters U.S. Air Force, Washington, D.C.
May 1980 – July 1980, student, F-15 Transition Course, Luke AFB, Arizona
July 1980 – August 1982, F-15 instructor pilot, flight commander, and Standardization and Evaluation Branch Chief, 18th Tactical Fighter Wing, Kadena AB, Japan
August 1982 – June 1983, student, Air Command and Staff College, Maxwell AFB, Alabama
July 1983 – August 1985, Commander, F-15 Technical Assistance Field Team, Khamis-Mushayet, Saudi Arabia
August 1985 – July 1988, assistant operations officer, 94th Tactical Fighter Squadron, later, Chief, Standardization and Evaluation Division, 1st Tactical Fighter Wing, later, operations officer, 48th Fighter Interceptor Squadron, Langley AFB, Virginia
July 1988 – August 1990, Commander, 1st Fighter Squadron, later, Assistant Deputy Commander for Operations, 325th Fighter Wing, Tyndall AFB, Florida
August 1990 – June 1991, student, Air War College, Maxwell AFB, Alabama
June 1991 – December 1991, Chief, Middle East, Africa and South Asia Policy, Plans and Operations Directorate, Headquarters U.S. Air Force, Washington, D.C.
December 1991 – April 1992, Deputy Assistant Director, Joint Chiefs of Staff and National Security Council Matters, Headquarters U.S. Air Force, Washington, D.C.
April 1992 – June 1993, Commander, 39th Operations Group, Incirlik AB, Turkey
July 1993 – May 1994, Commander, 20th Fighter Wing, RAF Upper Heyford, England
May 1994 – August 1995, Chief, Western Hemisphere Division (J-5), the Joint Staff, Washington, D.C.
September 1995 – August 1997, Commander, 24th Wing; Commander, U.S. Southern Command Air Forces Forward; and Director, Joint Interagency Task Force - South, Howard AFB, Panama
August 1997 – April 1999, Commander, 366th Wing, Mountain Home AFB, Idaho
April 1999 – April 2000, Commander, Joint Task Force - Southwest Asia, and Commander, 9th Air and Space Expeditionary Task Force - Southwest Asia, U.S. Central Command, Riyadh, Saudi Arabia
May 2000 – March 2002, Director of Air and Space Operations, Headquarters U.S. Air Forces Europe, Ramstein AB, Germany
March 2002 – July 2003, Assistant Deputy Chief of Staff for Air and Space Operations, Headquarters U.S. Air Force, Washington, D.C.
July 2003 – Sept 2006, Commander, 12th Air Force and Air Forces Southern, Davis-Monthan AFB, Arizona
 Retired 1 Sept 2006

Flight Information
Rating: Command pilot
Flight hours: More than 4,600, including more than 270 combat hours
Aircraft flown: F-111A/E/F, F-15A/B/C/D, A-10, F-16C Block 40/42, C-27 and C-21

Major Awards and decorations
  Defense Distinguished Service Medal
  Air Force Distinguished Service Medal
  Defense Superior Service Medal with oak leaf cluster
  Legion of Merit with oak leaf cluster
  Defense Meritorious Service Medal
  Meritorious Service Medal with two oak leaf clusters
  Air Medal with oak leaf cluster
  Aerial Achievement Medal with oak leaf cluster
  Air Force Commendation Medal with two oak leaf clusters
  Joint Meritorious Unit Award with four oak leaf clusters
  Air Force Outstanding Unit Award with four oak leaf clusters
  Combat Readiness Medal with two oak leaf clusters
  National Defense Service Medal with bronze star
  Armed Forces Expeditionary Medal
  Southwest Asia Service Medal with two bronze stars
  Grand Cross of the Air Force Cross of Aeronautical Merit (Colombia)
Estrella de las Fuerzas Armadas en el grado de Gran Estrella al Mérito Militar, Chile (Armed *Forces Military Star, Order of Grand Star for Military Merit)

Other achievements
1975 Top Gun outstanding graduate, F-111 Replacement Training Unit, 366th Tactical Fighter Wing
1991 Air War College finalist, Secretary of the Air Force Leadership Award
1994 Joint Chiefs of Staff Delegate, Inter-American Defense Board, Washington, D.C.
1997 Director, Joint Interagency Task Force - South, Panama
1999 Moller Trophy for outstanding wing commander, Air Combat Command

Effective dates of promotion
Second Lieutenant June 7, 1972
First Lieutenant June 7, 1974
Captain June 7, 1976
Major November 1, 1982
Lieutenant Colonel April 1, 1987
Colonel April 1, 1991
Brigadier General March 1, 1996
Major General July 1, 1999
Lieutenant General September 1, 2003

References

United States Air Force generals
Recipients of the Legion of Merit
United States Air Force Academy alumni
Recipients of the Air Medal
Harvard Kennedy School alumni
University of Northern Colorado alumni
Living people
Recipients of the Defense Superior Service Medal
Recipients of the Defense Distinguished Service Medal
Recipients of the Air Force Distinguished Service Medal
Year of birth missing (living people)